Anna Bühler (born 3 June 1997) is a German long jumper who competes in international elite events. She is a Universiade bronze medalist and a double European silver medalist.

References

1997 births
Living people
People from Öhringen
Sportspeople from Stuttgart (region)
German female long jumpers
Competitors at the 2017 Summer Universiade
Medalists at the 2017 Summer Universiade
Universiade bronze medalists in athletics (track and field)
Universiade bronze medalists for Germany